The Serenade for Orchestra No. 9 in D major K. 320, Posthorn, was written by Wolfgang Amadeus Mozart in Salzburg, in 1779. The manuscript is dated 3 August 1779 and was intended for the University of Salzburg's "" ceremony that year.

The serenade is scored for 2 flutes, piccolo, 2 oboes, 2 bassoons, 2 horns, 2 trumpets, post horn, timpani and strings. It has seven movements:

 Adagio maestoso – Allegro con spirito
 Minuetto
 Concertante: Andante grazioso in G major
 Rondeau: Allegro ma non troppo  in G major
 Andantino in D minor
 Minuetto – Trio 1 and 2
 Finale: Presto

The Concertante and Rondeau movements feature prominent concertante sections for flutes, oboes, and bassoons. These were performed on their own in a concert in the old Vienna Burgtheater on 23 March 1783, along with the Haffner symphony, an aria from Idomeneo, and several other works.

The first trio of the second minuet features a solo piccolo (called "flautino" in the manuscript) played over strings. The second trio of the second minuet features a solo for the post horn. This solo gives the serenade its nickname.

A typical performance lasts approximately 45 minutes.

Notes

External links
 
 

Serenade 09
Compositions in D major
1779 compositions